Snake antivenom is a medication made up of antibodies used to treat snake bites by venomous snakes. It is a type of antivenom.

It is a biological product that typically consists of venom neutralizing antibodies derived from a host animal, such as a horse or sheep.  The host animal is hyperimmunized to one or more snake venoms, a process which creates an immunological response that produces large numbers of neutralizing antibodies against various components (toxins) of the venom. The antibodies are then collected from the host animal, and further processed into snake antivenom for the treatment of envenomation.

It is on the World Health Organization's List of Essential Medicines.

Production
Antivenoms are typically produced using a donor animal, such as a horse or sheep. The donor animal is hyperimmunized with non-lethal doses of one or more venoms to produce a neutralizing antibody response. Then, at certain intervals, the blood from the donor animal is collected and neutralizing antibodies are purified from the blood to produce an antivenom.

Regulations
Human Medicine: In the United States, antivenom production and distribution is regulated by the Food and Drug Administration.
Veterinary Medicine: In the United States, antivenom production and distribution is regulated by the United States Department of Agriculture's Center for Veterinary Biologics.

Classification

Monovalent vs. polyvalent
Snake antivenom can be classified by which antigens (venoms) were used in the production process.  If the hyperimmunizing venom is obtained from a single species, then it is considered a monovalent antivenom.  If the antivenom contains neutralizing antibodies raised against two or more species of snakes, then the composition is considered polyvalent.

Antibody composition
Compositions of the antivenom can be classified as whole IgG, or fragments of IgG.  Whole antibody products consist of the entire antibody molecule, often immunoglobulin G (IgG), whereas antibody fragments are derived by digesting the whole IgG into Fab (monomeric binding) or F(ab')2 (dimeric binding).  The fragment antigen binding, or Fab, is the selective antigen binding region.  An antibody, such as IgG, can be digested by papain to produce three fragments: two Fab fragments and one Fc fragment.  An antibody can also be digested by pepsin to produce two fragments: a F(ab')2 fragment and a pFc' fragment.
The fragment antigen-binding (Fab fragment) is a region on an antibody that binds to antigens, such as venoms.  The molecular size of Fab is approximately 50kDa, making it smaller than F(ab')2 which is approximately 110kDa.  These size differences greatly affect the tissue distribution and rates of elimination.

Cross neutralization properties
Antivenoms may also have some cross protection against a variety of venoms from snakes within the same family or genera.  For instance, Antivipmyn (Instituto Bioclon) is made from the venoms of Crotalus durissus and Bothrops asper.  Antivipmyn has been shown to cross neutralize the venoms from all North American pit vipers.  Cross neutralization affords antivenom manufacturers the ability to hyperimmunize with fewer venom types to produce geographically suitable antivenoms.

Availability

Snake antivenom is complicated for manufacturers to produce. When weighed against profitability (especially for sale in poorer regions), the result is that many snake antivenoms, world-wide, are very expensive. Availability, from region to region, also varies.

Antivenom shortage for New World coral snake
, the relative rarity of coral snake bites, combined with the high costs of producing and maintaining an antivenom supply, means that antivenom (also called "antivenin") production in the United States has ceased. According to Pfizer, the owner of the company that used to make the antivenom Coralmyn, it would take between $5–$10 million for researching a new synthetic antivenom. The cost was too high in comparison to the small number of cases presented each year. The existing American coral snake antivenom stock technically expired in 2008, but the U.S. Food and Drug Administration has extended the expiration date every year through to at least 30 April 2017.  

Foreign pharmaceutical manufacturers have produced other coral snake antivenoms, but the costs of licensing them in the United States have stalled availability. Instituto Bioclon is developing a coral snake antivenom.  In 2013, Pfizer was reportedly working on a new batch of antivenom but had not announced when it would become available. , the Venom Immunochemistry, Pharmacology and Emergency Response (VIPER) institute of the University of Arizona College of Medicine was enrolling participants in a clinical trial of INA2013, a "novel antivenom," according to the Florida Poison Information Center.

Families of venomous snakes
Over 600 species are known to be venomous—about a quarter of all snake species. The following table lists some major species.

Types

References

Further reading

 
 

Antitoxins
Toxicology treatments